Şehzade Abdullah (c. 1525 –1528) was an Ottoman prince (şehzade), as the son of Ottoman Sultan Suleiman the Magnificent and of Hurrem Sultan, as Suleiman and Hurrem were in a monogamous relationship by the time of his birth. He was born in 1525 in Topkapi Palace, the Ottoman Empire and died due to a disease, possibly smallpox, in Istanbul, in 1528.

Although sometimes popularly considered, current historians believe he was not Mihrimah Sultan's twin as it is likely their births happened years apart.

References 

1520s births
1525 deaths
Ottoman princes
Suleiman the Magnificent
Royalty and nobility who died as children